Gladiovalva is a genus of moths in the family Gelechiidae.

Species
 Gladiovalva rumicivorella (Millière, 1881)
 Gladiovalva aizpuruai Vives, 1990
 Gladiovalva badidorsella (Rebel, 1935)
 Gladiovalva ignorella Falkovitsh & Bidzilya, 2003
 Gladiovalva pseudodorsella Sattler, 1960

References

 
Anomologini